James Curley (1 February 1846 – 27 March 1913) was an Australian politician.

He was elected as the member for Newcastle in the New South Wales Legislative Assembly at a by-election in 1889. He remained in office for less than two years.

References

 

Members of the New South Wales Legislative Assembly
1846 births
1913 deaths